This is a list of Billboard magazine's Top Hot 100 singles of 1985.

See also
1985 in music
List of Billboard Hot 100 number-one singles of 1985
List of Billboard Hot 100 top-ten singles in 1985

References

1985 record charts
Billboard charts